Chrysothyridia is a genus of moths of the family Crambidae.

Species
Chrysothyridia invertalis (Snellen, 1877)
Chrysothyridia triangulifera Munroe, 1967

References

Spilomelinae
Crambidae genera
Taxa named by Eugene G. Munroe